Sōjin Kamiyama or just Sōjin (30 January 1884 – 28 July 1954) was a Japanese film actor. He appeared in more than 70 films between 1917 and 1954. He was the subject of a 1995 TV documentary by the Japanese film director Nobuhiro Suwa. He was born in Sendai, Japan and died in Tokyo, Japan. His wife was actress Uraji Yamakawa.

Selected filmography

 Patria (1917, Serial) - Himself
 The Thief of Bagdad (1924) - The Mongol Prince
 Soft Shoes (1925) - Yet Tzu
 East of Suez (1925) - Lee Tai
 Proud Flesh  (1925) - Wong
 The White Desert (1925) - Chinese Cook
 The Wanderer (1925) - Sadyk the Jeweler (uncredited)
 My Lady's Lips (1925)
 The Sea Beast (1926, silent adaptation of Moby Dick) - Fedallah
 The Bat (1926) - Billy - the Butler
 The Lucky Lady (1926) - Secretary to Garletz
 Eve's Leaves (1926) - Le Sing
 The Road to Mandalay (1926) - English Charlie Wing
 Diplomacy (1926) - Chinese Diplomat
 Across the Pacific (1926)
 The Lady of the Harem (1926) - Sultan
 The Sky Pirate (1926)
 Driven from Home (1927)
 All Aboard (1927) - Prince
 The King of Kings (1927) - Prince Of Persia
 The Honorable Mr. Buggs (1927, Short) - The Crook
 Old San Francisco (1927) - Lu Fong (uncredited)
 Foreign Devils (1927) - Lama priest
 The Thirteenth Hour (1927) - Minor Role (uncredited)
 The Chinese Parrot (1927) - Charlie Chan
 The Devil Dancer (1927) - Sadik Lama
 The Haunted Ship (1927) - Bombay Charlie
 Streets of Shanghai (1927) - Fong Kiang
 The Man Without a Face (1928, Serial)
 Something Always Happens (1928) - Chang-Tzo
 The Crimson City (1928) - Sing Yoy
 Chinatown Charlie (1928) - The Mandarin
 The Hawk's Nest (1928) - Himself
 Out with the Tide (1928) - Chee Chee
 Telling the World (1928)
 Ships of the Night (1928) - Yut Sen
 Tropic Madness (1928)
 Manchu Love (1929)
 The Rescue (1929) - Daman
 China Slaver (1929) - Ming Foy / Wing Foy / The Cobra
 Seven Footprints to Satan (1929) - Himself
 Back from Shanghai (1929)
 Careers (1929) - Biwa Player
 Madame X (1929) - Oriental Doctor (uncredited)
 The Unholy Night (1929) - The Mystic
 Painted Faces (1929) - Cafe Owner (uncredited)
 The Show of Shows (1929) - Performer in '$20 Bet' Sketch
 Le spectre vert (1930)
 Golden Dawn (1930) - Piper
 The Dude Wrangler (1930) - Wong
 Way for a Sailor (1930) - Singapore Brothel Proprietor (uncredited)
 Ai yo jinrui to tomo ni are - Zenpen: Nihon hen (1931) - Kôkichi Yamaguchi
 Ai yo jinrui to tomo ni are - Kohen: Beikoku hen (1931)
 Tôjin Okichi (1931)
 Satsueijo romansu, renai annai (1932)
 Riku no wakôdo (1932)
 Chûshingura - Zempen: Akahokyô no maki (1932)
 Chûshingura - Kôhen: Edo no maki (1932) - Kônosuke Kira
 Chûshingura (1932) - Kozukenosuke Kira
 Kanraku no yo wa fukete (1934)
 Yotamono to komachimusume (1935) - Kaheiji
 Maihime no koyomi (1935)
 Dansei tai josei (1936) - Hikoma Okakura
 Hitozuma tsubaki (1936)
 Akanishi Kakita (1936) - Aki
 Hanayome karuta (1937) - Fortuneteller
 Konjiki yasha (1937) - Naoyuki Wanibuchi
 Hitozuma shinju (1938) - Kenzô
 Kokumin no chikai (1938)
 Gonin no kyodai (1939) - Kiyooka
 Utau noriai basha (1939) - Matsuzô
 Mazushiki mono no kofuku (1939) - Sakuzo Nakata
 Musume tazunete sanzen-ri (1940) - Popeye no Genzô
 Kurama Tengu (1942) - Jacob
 Kaizokuki futtobu (1943)
 Kokusai mitsuyu-dan (1944)
 Ôedo no oni (1947)
 Ryûgantô no himitsu (1950)
 Muteki (1952)
 Seven Samurai (1954) - the blind musician
 Samurai I: Musashi Miyamoto (1954)

References

External links
 
 Sojin at Aveleyman.com

1884 births
1954 deaths
Japanese male film actors
Japanese male silent film actors
People from Sendai
20th-century Japanese male actors
Expatriate male actors in the United States
Japanese expatriates in the United States